Nature Cure Hospital railway station is a railway station in Hyderabad, Telangana, India that is used for MMTS trains. Localities like Balkampet, Ameerpet, Sanjeeva Reddy Nagar, Punjagutta are accessible from this station. Begumpet and Fateh Nagar are the MMTS Railway stations present on either side of this railway station.

This railway station has two platforms and foot overbridge. Railway Reservation counter is present in this campus.

Lines
Multi-Modal Transport System, Hyderabad
Secunderabad–Falaknuma route (SF Line)

External links
MMTS Timings as per South Central Railway

MMTS stations in Hyderabad